Betty Lise (born 5 September 1972 in Fort de France, Martinique) is a retired French triple jumper. She formerly represented Martinique in the CARIFTA Games, a Caribbean regional competition.

She finished ninth at the 1997 World Indoor Championships, eighth at the 1997 World Championships, second at the 1997 Mediterranean Games and sixth at the 1998 European Indoor Championships, the latter in a new national indoor record of 14.26 metres.

Her personal best jump was 14.50 metres, achieved in August 1997 in Athens and setting the French record in the process. Her national indoor record was broken by Teresa Nzola Meso Ba who jumped 14.69 metres at the 2007 European Indoor Championships.

References

External links

1972 births
Living people
Sportspeople from Fort-de-France
Martiniquais athletes
French female triple jumpers
French people of Martiniquais descent
Mediterranean Games silver medalists for France
Mediterranean Games medalists in athletics
Athletes (track and field) at the 1997 Mediterranean Games